Contemporary groups, collectively termed Hindu reform movements, reform Hinduism, Neo-Hinduism, or Hindu revivalism, strive to introduce regeneration and reform to Hinduism, both in a religious or spiritual and in a societal sense. The movements started appearing during the Bengali Renaissance.

The religious aspect mostly emphasizes Vedanta tradition and mystical interpretations of Hinduism ("Neo-Vedanta"), and the societal aspect was an important element in the Indian independence movement, aiming at a "Hindu" character of the society of the eventual Republic of India.

History

From the 18th century onward India was being colonialised by the British. This colonialisation had a huge impact on Indian society, where social and religious leaders tried to assimilate the western culture and modernise Hindu culture. During the 19th century, Hinduism developed many new religious movements, partly inspired by the European Romanticism, nationalism, and esotericism (Theosophy) popular at the time. Conversely and contemporaneously, India had a similar effect on European culture with Orientalism, "Hindu style" architecture, reception of Buddhism in the West and similar.

Social reform movements

In social work, Swami Vivekananda, Dayananda Saraswati, Mahatma Gandhi, Vinoba Bhave, Baba Amte and Prabhat Ranjan Sarkar have been most important. Sunderlal Bahuguna created the chipko movement for the preservation of forestlands according to the Hindu ecological ideas.

The less accessible Vedas were rejected and parallel Vachanas were compiled.

Religious movements

Brahmo Samaj
The Brahmo Samaj is a social and religious movement founded in Kolkata in 1828 by Raja Ram Mohan Roy. The Brahmo Samaj movement thereafter resulted in the Brahmo religion in 1850 founded by Debendranath Tagore — better known as the father of Rabindranath Tagore.

Brahmo Samaj of South India 
The faith and Principles of Brahmo Samaj had spread to South Indian states like Andhra Pradesh, Tamil Nadu, Karnataka, and Kerala with many followers.

In Kerala the faith and principles of Brahmosamaj and Raja Ram Mohun Roy had been propagated by Ayyathan Gopalan, and reform activities had been led by establishing Brahmosamaj in 1898 in the Calicut (now Kozhikode) region. Gopalan was a doctor by profession, but dedicated his life to Brahmosamaj, and was an active executive member of the Calcutta Sadharan Brahmosamaj until his death.

The Calicut (Kerala) branch of Brahmomandir (Hall for conducting prayer meetings) was opened to public in the year 1900 (Now Ayathan School which runs under the patronage of Brahmosamaj at Jail road, Calicut). Second Branch of Brahmosamaj at Kerala was established at Alappuzha (South Kerala) in the year 1924 with a Brahmomandir(Hall for conducting prayer meeting's) established at Poonthoppu, Kommady (now Grihalakshmi Gandhi Smaraka seva sangam).

Ayyathan Gopalan was a social reformer of Kerala and the founder of Sugunavardhini movement, which was established to protect the rights of women, children, and the underprivileged sections such as the Harijan communities (Dalits) and to educate them. He established the Lady Chandawarkar Elementary School with the aim of educating girls and the underprivileged for free. Gopalan translated the "Bible of Brahmosamaj" or "Brahmodarma" written by Maharshi Debendranath Tagore into Malayalam.

Rabindranath Tagore described Ayyathan Gopalan as the "Raja Ram Mohan Roy of Kerala" during the annual general meeting of the Brahmo Samaj.

Arya Samaj
The Arya Samaj is a monotheistic Hindu reform movement founded in India by Maharshi Dayananda in 1875 at Bombay. He was an ascetic who believed in the infallible authority of the Vedas. Members of the Arya Samaj believe in one God and reject the worship of idols. Dayanand's interpretation of the Vedas was both unique and radical; for example, he taught that the Vedas unambiguously advocate monotheism. He stressed that the Vedas do not contain any mention of idol worship, because they teach that God is a nonmaterial, formless and metaphysical spirit and, further, emphasise the doctrine of karma and reincarnation, the ideals of brahmacharya (chastity) and sanyasa (renunciation). Dayananda claimed that the Veda is the only true scripture because God reveals His true word at the outset of creation (otherwise He would be imperfect by having deprived many human generations of true knowledge until the inception of today's various religions) and that, most definitely, there is no place in it of a discriminatory or hereditary caste system.

It aimed to be a universal structure based on the authority of the Vedas. Dayananda stated that he wanted 'to make the whole world Aryan', i.e. he wanted to develop missionary Hinduism based on the universality of the Vedas. To this end, the Arya Samaj started Shuddhi movement in early 20th century to bring back Hinduism to people converted to Islam and Christianity, set up schools and missionary organisations, and extended its activities outside India. Jawaharlal Nehru, the first prime minister of India in his book, The Discovery of India credits Arya Samaj in introducing proselytization in Hinduism.

The Samaj has branches around the world and has a significant number of adherents among people of Indian ancestry in Guyana, Trinidad and Tobago, Suriname, the Caribbean, the Netherlands, the United Kingdom, and the United States.

Ramakrishna Movement

Swami Vivekananda was a central personality in the development of another stream of Hinduism in late 19th century and the early 20th century that reconciled the devotional (bhakti-märga) path of his guru Sri Ramakrishna (of the Puri dashanami sampradäya) with the gnana märga (path of knowledge). His ideals and sayings have inspired numerous Indians as well as non-Indians, Hindus as well as non-Hindus. Among the prominent figures whose ideals were very much influenced by them were Rabindranath Tagore, Gandhi, Subhas Bose, Satyendranath Bose, Megh Nad Saha,  Sister Nivedita, and Sri Aurobindo.

Other significant movements
 Matua Mahasangha
 Narayana Dharma
 Prarthana Samaj
 Swadhyay Parivar
 Rashtriya Swayamsevak Sangh

Influence on the West
Early in the 19th century the first translations of Hindu texts appeared in the west, and inspired western philosophers such as Arthur Schopenhauer. Helena Blavatsky moved to India in 1879, and her Theosophical Society, founded in New York in 1875, evolved into a mixture of Western occultism and Hindu mysticism over the last years of her life.

See also

 Ayyathan Gopalan
 Bengal Renaissance
 Contemporary Sant Mat movements
 List of Hindu organisations
 Hinduism in the West
 Hindu nationalism

References

Sources

 
 
 
 
 
 
 
 
 
 
 J. Zavos, Defending Hindu Tradition: Sanatana Dharma as a Symbol of Orthodoxy in Colonial India, Religion (Academic Press), Volume 31, Number 2, April 2001, pp. 109–123.
 Ghanshyam Shah, Social Movements in India: A Review of the Literature, New Delhi, Sage India, 2nd ed. (2004)

External links

 Experiences of Struggles Against untouchability in Tamil Nadu
 Forum to fight against untouchability
 Dalits given entry into Tamil Nadu temple after decades

Hindu denominations
Neo-Vedanta